Black Tulip may refer to:

 Operation Black Tulip, a 1945 plan to forcibly evict all Germans from the Netherlands
 The Black Tulip, an 1850 novel
 Black Tulip (plane), the Soviet military transport Antonov An-12 plane which was taking away corpses of the lost Soviet military personnel ("cargo 200") from the territory of Afghanistan during the Afghan—Soviet war (1979–1989)

See also
 The Black Tulip (disambiguation)